Only Time Knows is the debut album by Bearfoot Bluegrass, released in late February, 2001.

Development 
Bearfoot Bluegrass was more of a music camp band than a festival performing band when they went to Surreal Studio in Anchorage and cut Only Time Knows, assembled without a producer. Bearfoot Bluegrass went on to win the Telluride Bluegrass band contest in June the same year.  The band members were 16–19 years old when they created their first album and won the Telluride band contest.

Track listing

Personnel 
Bearfoot Bluegrass
Angela Oudean – Vocals, fiddle
Annalisa Woodlee – Vocals, fiddle
Malani O'Toole – Vocals, fiddle, guitar
Jason Norris – Vocals, mandolin
Kate Hamre – Acoustic bass
Mike Mickelson – Lead guitar, rhythm guitar

Production
Kristi Olson – Recorded by, engineered

References

External links 

2001 debut albums
Bearfoot (American band) albums